Estudios América was a Mexican film studio and production company which grew to prominence producing films for Antonio Aguilar, Gaspar Henaine, María Elena Velasco, and Vicente Fernández. It was one of the four main film studios of the classic Mexican cinema along with Estudios Churubusco, Estudios San Ángel, and Estudios Tepeyac.

The studio's sound stages appear in Duro pero seguro, a 1978 film starring María Elena Velasco as La India María who became the studio's exclusive artist in the early 1980s after her contract with Diana Films ended.

In 1993, the studio was sold by the Mexican government as part of the sale of Imevisión. Bought by Ricardo Salinas Pliego, the studio shut down as a film company and in 1996 was converted into a television studio for TV Azteca, where their soap operas and other programming are taped. In 2012, the studio was expanded and currently consists of twelve soundstages.

A couple of the movies shot by Estudios América can be seen on TV in Univision and Telemundo.

Selected films produced by Estudios América

Selected films shot at Estudios América

Mexican film studios
Film production companies of Mexico